The 2022 Tour of the Basque Country (officially known as Itzulia Basque Country 2022) was a road cycling stage race held between 4 and 9 April 2022 in the titular region in northern Spain. It was the 61st edition of the Tour of the Basque Country and the 13th race of the 2022 UCI World Tour.

Teams 
All 18 UCI WorldTeams and five UCI ProTeams made up the 23 teams that participated in the race. With one late non-starter,  was also reduced to six riders. In total, 155 riders started the race, of which only 54 finished; there were 25 riders who did not finish the last stage, while a further 39 riders finished over the time limit on the final stage.

UCI WorldTeams

 
 
 
 
 
 
 
 
 
 
 
 
 
 
 
 
 
 

UCI ProTeams

Route

Stages

Stage 1 
4 April 2022 — Hondarribia to Hondarribia,  (ITT)

Stage 2 
5 April 2022 — Leitza to Viana,

Stage 3 
6 April 2022 — Laudio to Amurrio,

Stage 4 
7 April 2022 — Vitoria-Gasteiz to Ingeteam Parke Zamudio,

Stage 5 
8 April 2022 — Ingeteam Parke Zamudio to Mallabia,

Stage 6 
9 April 2022 — Eibar to Arrate,

Classification leadership table 

 On stage 2, Geraint Thomas, who was fourth in the points classification, wore the green jersey, because first-placed Primož Roglič wore the yellow jersey as the leader of the general classification, second-placed Remco Evenepoel wore the polka-dot jersey as the leader of the mountains classification, and third-placed Rémi Cavagna wore the French national champion's jersey as the defending French national road race champion.
 On stage 2, Ben Tulett, who was second in the young rider classification, wore the blue jersey, because first-placed Remco Evenepoel wore the polka-dot jersey as the leader of the mountains classification.
 On stage 3, Adam Yates, who was fourth in the points classification, wore the green jersey, because first-placed Primož Roglič wore the yellow jersey as the leader of the general classification, second-placed Remco Evenepoel wore the blue jersey as the leader of the young rider classification, and third-placed Julian Alaphilippe wore the world champion's jersey as the defending world road race champion.
 On stage 6, Felix Gall, who was second in the young rider classification, wore the blue jersey, because first-placed Remco Evenepoel wore the yellow jersey as the leader of the general classification.

Final classification standings

General classification

Points classification

Mountains classification

Young rider classification

Basque rider classification

Team classification

Notes 

As of 1 March 2022, the UCI announced that cyclists from Russia and Belarus would no longer compete under the name or flag of those respective countries due to the Russian invasion of Ukraine.

References

Sources

External links 
 

Tour of the Basque Country
Tour of the Basque Country
Tour of the Basque Country
2022
2022